Jhonny Vásquez is a Colombian footballer. He currently plays as a defensive midfielder for Deportivo Pereira in the Categoría Primera A.

External links
Profile at BDFA

Living people
Colombian footballers
Deportivo Cali footballers
1987 births
Association football midfielders
Sportspeople from Cauca Department